The Shilin Shennong Temple is a Chinese temple dedicated to Shennong Dadi and it is located in Shilin District, Taipei, Taiwan.

History
The temple was originally constructed as Fude Shrine for Tudigong in 1709 in Shulin Village. In 1741, the temple was destroyed by flood. As a result, it was relocated to its current location at Jiujia Village and rebuilt with the name Zhilan Temple by immigrants from Zhangzhou in Fujian. In 1812, the temple was renamed Shennong Temple. The temple was once an important base during a conflict between settlers from Zhangzhou and Quanzhou. In 1972, the temple was renovated when reinforced concrete was introduced to construct the Three Rivers Hall and Bell and Drum Tower. In 1993, the main wall was renovated into a two-story building.

Transportation
The temple is accessible within walking distance north of Shilin Station of Taipei Metro.

See also
 Chin Shan Yen Hui Chi Temple
 List of temples in Taiwan
 List of tourist attractions in Taiwan

References

1709 establishments in Taiwan
Religious buildings and structures completed in 1709
Taoist temples in Taipei